Foshee may refer to:

People
 Douglas Foshee, American businessman
 Edgar Foshee, American military officer
 Eugene Crum Foshee (1937-2017), American politician
 Paul Foshee (1932–2020), American politician
 Taryn Foshee (born 1985), American beauty queen
 Thuong Nguyen Cuc Foshee, Vietnamese-American human rights activist

Places
United States
 Foshee, Alabama
 Fosheeton, Alabama